The 2018–19 Siena Saints men's basketball team represented Siena College during the 2018–19 NCAA Division I men's basketball season. They played their home games at the Times Union Center in Albany, New York as members of the Metro Atlantic Athletic Conference and were led by first-year head coach Jamion Christian. They finished the 2018–19 season 17–16 overall, 11–7 in MAAC play to finish in a four-way tie for second place. As the 5th seed in the 2019 MAAC tournament, they defeated No. 4 seed Rider in the quarterfinals 87–81 before falling to No. 1 seed Iona 57–73 in the semifinals.

On March 21, 2019, head coach Jamion Christian left his job with Siena to become the new head coach at George Washington. The school promoted assistant coach Carmen Maciariello to fill the vacancy on March 26.

Previous season 
The Saints finished the 2017–18 season 8–24, 4–14 in MAAC play to finish in a tie for tenth place. They lost in the first round of the MAAC tournament to Quinnipiac.

On April 13, 2018, head coach Jimmy Patsos resigned amid an investigation regarding abusive conduct and financial improprieties within the program. On May 2, the Saints hired Mount St. Mary's head coach Jamion Christian for the job.

Roster

Schedule and results

|-
!colspan=9 style=|Non-conference regular season

|-
!colspan=9 style=|MAAC regular season

|-
!colspan=9 style=| MAAC tournament

Source:

References

Siena Saints men's basketball seasons
Siena
Siena basketball
Siena basketball